Nicholas d 'Oisy, Lord of Avesnes, nicknamed  ("the Beautiful") ( – ), was a son of Walter I, Lord of Avesnes and his wife, Ada of Tournai.  He was Lord of Avesnes, Leuze and Condé.  He built castles in Landrechies and Condé.

Nicholas was married to Matilda de la Roche, the widow of Thierry de Walcourt.  She was the daughter of Henry I of la Roche ( – 1126), Count of la Roche and warden of Stavelot and Malmedy and his wife, Matilda of Limburg.  Her paternal grandfather was Albert III, Count of Namur; her maternal grandfather was Henry, Duke of Lower Lorraine.

They had the following children:
 James of Avesnes, succeeded his father and died during the Third Crusade
 Ida (d. ), married Ingelram, Count of Saint Pol and secondly, castellan William IV of Saint-Omer
 Fastrad, warden of La Flamengerie Abbey.  He had three children, of whom James became bishop of Tournai
 a daughter
 possibly Radulf

Avesnes family
Lords of Avesnes
12th-century births
12th-century deaths
12th-century French people
Year of birth unknown
Year of death unknown